Liam James Halligan (born 29 April 1969) is a British economist, journalist, author and broadcaster. He is currently economics and business editor at GB News.

Since 2003, Halligan has written a weekly column in The Sunday Telegraph. He also presents The Telegraphs weekly Planet Normal podcast.

Early life and education 
Halligan was born to an Irish family and grew up in Kingsbury, London. Halligan attended the John Lyon School on a scholarship, where he became head boy.

The first person in his family to attend university, he graduated with a first-class degree in economics from the University of Warwick and went on to gain an MPhil in economics from St Antony's College, Oxford.

Career

Economics and policy 
In 1992, following graduation, Halligan joined his former university tutor Robert Skidelsky at The Social Market Foundation, the Westminster-based think tank. He later worked at the International Food Policy Research Institute and in the Fiscal Affairs Department at the International Monetary Fund in Washington, USA, as a research economist.

In 1994, Halligan joined the Centre for Economic Performance at the London School of Economics and moved to Moscow. In Moscow he shared a flat with Dominic Cummings.

Together with other economists from LSE, Oxford and Harvard, he co-founded Russian Economic Trends, an academic journal that published macroeconomic data, analysis and commentary on Russia. He also helped to establish the Russian-European Centre for Economic Policy, an inter-governmental policy advisory group.

Since 1997, Halligan has sat on the Policy Advisory Board of The Social Market Foundation. In 2010, he became a founder member of the Centre for Competitive Advantage in the Global Economy (CAGE), an ESRC-funded research centre at the University of Warwick.

In 2017, Halligan was invited to join an expert advisory committee at the Department for International Trade. He has also testified before a number of Parliamentary committees. In April 2020, he called for the Government to build more social housing. In February 2021, he appeared before the Lords Economic Affairs Select Committee on quantitative easing.

In 2019, he published Home Truths, which argues that the UK's housing shortage deprives vulnerable families of decent social housing.

In 2020, he was shortlisted by the Government for the post of Downing Street TV Press Secretary.

Journalism 
In the early 1990s, Halligan wrote a weekly column for The Moscow Times and covered Russian economics and politics for The Economist and The Economist Intelligence Unit. He also wrote about the Soviet Union for The Wall Street Journal and Euromoney.

In 1996, Halligan was appointed political correspondent at the Financial Times. He covered the 1997 general election and Good Friday Agreement as part of a team led by political editor Robert Peston. He went on to become economics correspondent at Channel 4 News, where he remained until 2006.

From 1999 to 2002, while at Channel 4 News, Halligan wrote a weekly economics column for Sunday Business before moving his column to The Sunday Telegraph. In 2006, he was appointed economics editor at The Sunday Telegraph. From 2008 to 2010, he wrote a monthly column for GQ.

Halligan was a founding panellist on the daily television discussion show CNN Talk. He was a regular panellist on This Week, presented by Andrew Neil. When the BBC axed the programme in 2019, Halligan said the corporation had made a "blindingly obvious mistake".

Since 2004, he has also regularly presented standalone documentaries on Channel 4, including for Dispatches, and sits on the jury of the Royal Television Society's Specialist Journalist award.

In March 2021, Halligan was named as economics and business editor at GB News and co-presenter of a daily lunchtime show with former Labour Party MP Gloria De Piero.

From September 2021 to September 2022, Halligan presented his own show on GB News, On The Money, which ran for an hour every weekday and focused on financial topics. On 1 September 2022, it was announced that the show was to be axed, with Halligan having an increased presence on other GB News programmes, centering around the Cost of living crisis.

Halligan has also written for New Statesman, Prospect, and UnHerd. He also writes for The Spectator and The Sun. He has presented shows on LBC and BBC Radio Five Live.

Business 
Between 2008 and 2013, Halligan was Chief Economist at Prosperity Capital Management, an institutional asset management focussed on the Soviet Union.

Since 2014, Halligan has been a shareholder at Bne IntelliNews, where he is also Editor-at-Large.

Personal life 
He lives with journalist and author Lucy Ward, and they have two daughters and one son together.

Halligan is a citizen of both the UK and the Republic of Ireland. In 2012, he was invited to join the Global Irish Network, an advisory board of Irish nationals living outside Ireland. He is also a regular panellist at the Kilkenomics Festival.

In 2016, he was appointed a Governor at John Lyon School. His hobbies include guitar, double bass, traditional Irish music, choral music, film, rowing, and sailing.

Recognition

As an individual 
 1998. Business Broadcaster of the Year. The Wincott Foundation Awards.
 2005. Business Broadcast Journalist of the Year. World Leadership Forum.
 2006. Business Broadcast Journalist of the Year. World Leadership Forum.
 2007. Business Commentator of the Year. British Press Awards.
 2007. Columnist of the Year. WorkWorld Media Award.

For output 
 1999. Programme of the Year – Channel 4 News (Economics and Business). The Industrial Society Awards.
 2002. UK Current Affairs Programme of the Year – Channel 4 News (Economics and Business). The Wincott Foundation Awards.
 2002. UK Current Affairs Programme of the Year – Channel 4 News (Economics and Business). WorkWorld Media Award.
 2007. UK Current Affairs Programme of the Year – Dispatches. The Wincott Foundation Awards.
 2018. UK Current Affairs Programme of the Year – Dispatches. The Wincott Foundation Awards.

Selected bibliography 
 2020. Groupthink, Brexit and the Future of the BBC. Published in Is The BBC Still In Peril – And Does It Deserve To Be? Bite-Sized Books.
 2019. Home Truths: The UK’s Chronic Housing Shortage – How it Happened, Why it Matters and How to Solve It. Biteback.
 2017. Clean Brexit: How to Make a Success of Leaving the European Union. Biteback. (with Gerard Lyons)
 2012. Africa: The Last True investment Frontier. Published in The EU and Africa. Hurst & Co.
 2006. No Choice but Compulsion: Why We Should Be Forced To Save For Old Age. Published in Defusing the Pension Time Bomb. Stockholm Network.
 1998. Lessons from Attempted Macroeconomic Stabilisations in Russia. Social Market Foundation/Centre for Transition Economies. (with Robert Skidelsky)
 1997. Investment Disincentives in Russia. Communist Economies & Economic Transformation. (with Pavel Teplukhin)
 1997. Consumer Price Reforms & Safety Nets in Transition Economies. Published in Fiscal Policy and Economic Reform: Essays in Honor of Vito Tanzi, Blejer M. & T. Ter-Minassian. Routledge (with Ehtisham Ahmad)
 1995. Russia's New Parliament: A Business Analysis. Economist Intelligence Unit.
 1994. Europe Isn’t Working – Active Labour Market Policies Across the EU. Institute of Community Studies. (with Frank Field)
 1993. Beyond Unemployment. Social Market Foundation. (with Robert Skidelsky)
 1993. Another Great Depression: Historical Lessons for the 1990s. Social Market Foundation. (with Robert Skidelsky)

Selected filmography

Presenter 
 2021. Britain's £400bn Covid Bill – Who Will Pay? Dispatches. Channel 4.
 2020. Britain's Train Hell. Dispatches. Channel 4.
 2019. Britain's New-Build Scandal. Dispatches. Channel 4.
 2019. HS2: The Great Train Robbery. Dispatches. Channel 4.
 2018. Carillion: How to Lose Seven Billion Pounds. Dispatches. Channel 4.
 2016. Britain's Home-Building Scandal. Dispatches. Channel 4.
 2013. Quantitative Easing: Miracle Cure or Dangerous Addiction? BBC Radio 4.
 2007. NHS – Where Did All the Money Go? Dispatches. Channel 4.
 2006. Public Service, Private Profit. Dispatches. Channel 4.
 2006. Whose Pension Are You Paying? 30 Minutes. Channel 4.
 2004. How Safe Is Your Pension? 30 Minutes. Channel 4.

Producer 
 2020. Neither Confirm Nor Deny.

References

External links 
 www.liamhalligan.com Liam Halligan's website (with links to documentary and writing archive)

1969 births
Living people
Alumni of St Antony's College, Oxford
Alumni of the University of Warwick
British business and financial journalists
British columnists
20th-century British economists
British political journalists
British television journalists
ITN newsreaders and journalists
People educated at The John Lyon School
Austrian School economists
GB News newsreaders and journalists
21st-century British economists